The Universidad Autónoma de Bucaramanga or UNAB (Autonomous University of Bucaramanga) is a private post-secondary education institution in Bucaramanga, Colombia. It was founded in 1952 under the name of Instituto Caldas.  In 1956 the institution was recognized as a law school, and became a university under the current name in 1987. Administration, Law and Public Accounting are its oldest programs. It now offers 19 programs.

The Faculty of Social Communication, with its two lines, Organizational and Journalism, was credited by the Colombia's National Accreditation Council for six years as a High Quality program, becoming this way one of the six faculties of Communication with this title in the country. UNAB received the certification of Acreditación of International Quality granted by the Consejo Latinoamericano de Acreditación de la Educación en Periodismo, CLAEP that stands out the "execution of the norms of quality and excellence in the formation of journalists for the period 2006-2012".

Other recognitions of the Faculty of Social Communication of UNAB in 2006 were the best position at national level in the tests of academic quality, Ecaes; the reward given to the Periódico 15, the Faculty's students newspaper, as the "best university newspaper" of Colombia. The last of them was the Simón Bolívar National Journalism Prize in the Best interview category, received by journalist Pastor Virviescas, chief editor of the paper.

External links 
 

 
Educational institutions established in 1952
1952 establishments in Colombia